RegTransBase is database of regulatory interactions and transcription factor binding sites in prokaryotes

See also
Transcription factors

References

External links
 http://regtransbase.lbl.gov.

Biological databases
Transcription factors
DNA
Biophysics